Hyles chamyla, the dogbane hawkmoth, is a moth of the family Sphingidae. It is only known from Xinjiang in China.

The wingspan is 52–75 mm. It is a variable species. The pink area of the hindwing can be intense or faint.

The larvae possibly feed on Apocynum species.

References

Hyles (moth)
Moths described in 1913